The Bustill family is a prominent American family of largely African, European and Lenape Native American descent. The family has included artists, educators, journalists and activists, both against slavery and against Jim Crow.

History
Born in Burlington, New Jersey on February 2, 1732, Cyrus Bustill was a son of the Quaker lawyer Samuel Bustill and Parthenia, a woman of African descent who was held in bondage by him. When Samuel Bustill died in 1742, his legal widow, Grace Bustill, subsequently arranged for the sale of Cyrus Bustill to fellow Quaker Thomas Prior (or "Pryor") with the understanding that Prior would allow Cyrus to train and earn enough money as an apprentice baker in order to purchase his freedom.

Cyrus would go on to either purchase his freedom or receive manumission at an indeterminate date, then become a businessman and landowner in his own right thereafter. At the time of his death in 1806, he was a leading member of the African-American upper class of Philadelphia.

Cyrus and his wife, the mixed race Elizabeth Morey (1746-1827, of Native American and European descent), had eight children. One of them was the abolitionist and feminist advocate Grace Douglass.

Other notable descendants of Cyrus and Elizabeth Morey Bustill include the performer and activist Paul Robeson, the artist David Bustill Bowser, the educator, abolitionist and writer Sarah Mapps Douglass, the journalist and activist Gertrude Bustill Mossell, and the artist and activist Robert Douglass Jr.

Family tree

 Samuel Bustill (d. 1742) m. Parthenia
 Cyrus Bustill (1732-1806) m. Elizabeth Morey (1746–1827)
 Grace Douglass (1782 – March 9, 1842) m. Robert Douglass
 Sarah Mapps Douglass (1806-1882)
 Elizabeth Douglass
 Robert Douglass Jr. (1809–1887)
 three other children
 David Bustill m. Elizabeth W. Hicks
 Charles Hicks Bustill (1816–1890) m. Emily Robinson
 Gertrude Bustill Mossell (1855–1948) m. Nathan Francis Mossell
 Florence Mossell
 Mary Mossell Griffin (c. 1885 — after January 1963) m. Joshua R. Griffin Jr.
 Maria Louisa Bustill m. William Drew Robeson I
 William Drew Jr. (born 1881)
 Reeve (born c. 1887)
 Ben (born c. 1893)
 Marian (born c. 1895)
 Paul Robeson (1898–1976) m. Eslanda Goode
 Paul Robeson Jr. (1927–2014) m. Marilyn Paula Greenberg
 David (died 1998)
 Susan
 Joseph Cassey Bustill (1822–1895) m. Sarah Humphreys (1829–?)
  Anna Amelia Bustill (1862–?) m. James Humphery Smith 
Humphery J. Smith
Virginia Bustill Smith (1893–1978) m. Joseph Walter Rhetta
Carldon Walter Rhetta m. Wilhelmina Chapman
James Curtis Rhetta m. Ruth A. Washington
James Curtis Rhetta II m. Emma F. Johnson
Mark Rhetta 
Zoey Rhetta
James C. Rhetta III m. Yolanda Causey
James C. RhettaIV
Jacob C. Rhetta
Curtis L. Smith
George J. Smith
John R. Smith
Anna E. Smith
 Mary Bustill Miller m. John Miller
 Cyrus Bustill Miller
 Ruth
 Rachael Bustill Bowser (1780-1848) m. Jeremiah Bowser (1766–1856)
 David Bustill Bowser (1820–1900) m. Elizabeth Harriet Stevens Gray (June 13, 1831 – November 29, 1908)
 Raphael Bowser
 Ida Elizabeth Bowser Asbury (1870–1955)
 Leah
 Charles
 Cyrus, Jr.

See also
 Quander family
 Syphax family
 Vaughan family

References

Robeson-Bustill family
African-American families